The commune of Muyinga is a commune of Muyinga Province in northeastern Burundi. The capital lies at Muyinga.

References

Communes of Burundi
Muyinga Province